The 1975 World Rowing Championships was the fifth World Rowing Championships. It was held from 21 to 30 August at Holme Pierrepont National Watersports Centre in Nottingham, England.

Medal summary 

Medalists at the 1975 World Rowing Championships were:

Men's events

Women's events

Event codes

Medal table 
Medals by country (including lightweight rowing events):

Finals

Great Britain

References

World Rowing Championships
Sport in Nottingham
World Rowing Championships
Rowing
Rowing
Rowing
Rowing in England
World Rowing Championships
Sports competitions in Nottingham
1970s in Nottingham